Bordea is a genus of European dwarf spiders that was first described by R. Bosmans in 1995.  it contains only three species: B. berlandi, B. cavicola, and B. negrei.

See also
 List of Linyphiidae species

References

Araneomorphae genera
Linyphiidae